The 1971 Miami Redskins football team was an American football team that represented Miami University in the Mid-American Conference (MAC) during the 1971 NCAA University Division football season. In their third season under head coach Bill Mallory, Miami compiled a 7–3 record (2–3 against MAC opponents), finished in a tie for third place in the MAC, and outscored all opponents by a combined total of 207 to 117. The team's defense allowed only 11.7 points per game, which ranked 12th among 128 NCAA University Division football teams.

The team's statistical leaders included Stu Showalter with 464 passing yards, Bob Hitchens with 1,157 rushing yards, and John Viher with 251 receiving yards.

Middle guard Doug Krause won the Miami most valuable player award. Krause, Dick Dougherty, and Marc Smith were the team captains.

Schedule

References

Miami
Miami RedHawks football seasons
Miami Redskins football